Thomas Ivory (died 1786) was an Irish architect, one of the significant figures in the building of Georgian Dublin. He is often called "Thomas Ivory of Cork", and is to be distinguished from his contemporary Thomas Ivory of Norwich.

Life
Said to have been a carpenter's apprentice self-educated, and from Cork, Ivory worked in Dublin under the gunsmith Thomas Trulock. He then studied under the draughtsman Jonas Blaymire. 

 
Ivory practised in Dublin, and was appointed master of architectural drawing in the schools of the Royal Dublin Society in 1759. He held the post till his death, and among his pupils were Henry Aaron Baker, James Hoban and Martin Archer Shee. Thomas Roberts was articled to him.

Ivory died in Dublin in December 1786.

Works
In 1765, Ivory prepared designs and an estimate for additional buildings to the Royal Dublin Society premises in Shaw's Court, but these were not executed. Ivory's major work was the King's Hospital in Blackhall Place (commonly known as the Blue Coat Hospital), in the classic style. The first stone was laid on 16 June 1773, but from want of money the central cupola was not finished.

Ivory designed Lord Newcomen's bank, built in 1781, at the corner of Castle Street and Cork Hill; it later became a public health office. The Royal Hibernian Marine School, often attributed to him, was more probably the work of Thomas Cooley. He made a drawing of the Casino at Marino, near Dublin, which was engraved by Edward Rooker.

In the board-room of the King's Hospital was a picture (assigned to 1775 and John Trotter) said to represent Ivory and eight others sitting at or standing round a table on which are spread plans of the new building.

Notes

Attribution

Year of birth missing
1786 deaths
Irish architects
People from Cork (city)